Types of engineer include: 
 Chartered Engineer
 European Engineer
 Incorporated Engineer
 Professional Engineer
 Royal Engineer

Lists of individual engineers by discipline include:
 List of aerospace engineers
 List of canal engineers
 List of chemical engineers
 List of civil engineers
 List of combat engineering corps
 List of electrical engineers
 List of environmental engineers
 List of genetic engineers
 List of industrial engineers
 List of mechanical engineers
 List of structural engineers
 List of systems engineers

See also

 List of British engineers
 List of inventors
 List of architects
 List of urban planners
 Lists of scientists
 List of fictional scientists and engineers

 
Lists of people in STEM fields
Lists of engineering lists